The Mitchell colonial by-election, 1866 was a by-election held on 22 February 1866 in the electoral district of Mitchell for the Queensland Legislative Assembly.

History
On 1 January 1866, John Gore Jones, the member for Mitchell, resigned. Theodore Harden won the resulting by-election on 22 February 1866.

See also
 Members of the Queensland Legislative Assembly, 1863–1867

References

1866 elections in Australia
Queensland state by-elections
1860s in Queensland